Feels like Home is the second studio album by American singer-songwriter Norah Jones, released on February 10, 2004, through Blue Note Records. It serves as the follow up to Jones' 2002 breakthrough album, Come Away with Me.

At the 47th Annual Grammy Awards the album was nominated for Best Pop Vocal Album. "Sunrise", the album's lead single, won the Grammy Award for Best Female Pop Vocal Performance. "Creepin' In", featuring Dolly Parton, was also nominated for a Grammy, in the category of Best Country Collaboration with Vocals.

Critical reception

Feels like Home received generally positive reviews from music critics. At Metacritic, which assigns a normalized rating out of 100 to reviews from mainstream critics, the album has an average score of 74 out of 100, which indicates "generally favorable reviews" based on 19 reviews.

Writing for Yahoo! Music, Ken Micallef gave the album a favorable review and said, "Recalling Come Away With Me only for Jones's sultry voice, the album has its share of pleasant throwaways, but those are balanced by a handful of starkly beautiful and excellently arranged songs." The A.V. Club's Keith Phipps also gave it a favorable review and stated that the album "should neither shock old fans nor disappoint those hoping to hear [Jones] reach for more." E! Online gave it a B+ and said, "Instead of making any stupid concessions to her sudden celebrity... the Home girl plays it cool, carrying on with the same smooth vibes that made her a star." Spin also gave it a B+, calling it "A better record than Come Away--less piano bar, more honkey-tonk." Mojo gave it four stars out of five and said the album was "similar to the debut.... But there's a more vivid light-and-shade to the textures and a craft and depth to the compositions that represent a welcome distillation of Jones' art." The Village Voice gave the album a positive review and stated, "If the choice of songs and beat and instrumentation were sometimes restrictive, still the piano and the voice endured." Blender gave it three-and-a-half stars out of five and said that its mood was "more or less the same, if slight friskier."

Other reviews are average, mixed or negative: Uncut gave the album three stars out of five and stated that, "Yes, it's an unchallenging and even deeply conservative record. But its class is positively aristocratic." The Austin Chronicle gave it two stars out of five and said, "Material is everything to a chanteuse, and in contrast to Come Away With Me, the problem here is that Jones wrote/co-wrote almost half of the Homes 13 tracks." The Guardian only gave it one star out of five and said that the album was "so inoffensive you have trouble remembering whether you put it on."

Commercial performance
Feels like Home sold 1,022,000 copies in its first week of release in the U.S. It sold 395,000 copies in its second week and spent its first six weeks of release atop the Billboard 200. It was the second best-selling album of 2004 in the U.S., selling 3,842,920 copies. It stands as the ninth largest first-week sales for a female artist, behind Adele's 25, Britney Spears' Oops...! I Did It Again, Taylor Swift's 1989, Reputation, Red, Midnights and Speak Now, and Lady Gaga's Born This Way. In the Netherlands, it was the year's best-selling album and the twenty-fourth best-selling album of the 2000s.

Track listing
Writing credits from AllMusic.

Deluxe Edition  (CD and DVD)
 "Sleepless Nights" (Deluxe Edition bonus disc)
 "Moon Song" (Deluxe Edition bonus disc)
 "I Turned Your Picture to the Wall" (Deluxe Edition bonus disc)
 "In the Morning" (live) (DVD)
 "She" (live) (DVD)
 "Long Way Home" (live) (DVD)
 "Creepin' In" (live) (DVD)
 "Sunrise" (music video) (DVD)
 "What Am I to You?" (music video) (DVD)
 Interview with Norah (DVD)

Personnel
Musicians

 Norah Jones – vocals, piano (1, 3, 4, 6, 8, 12, 13), Wurlitzer electronic piano (2, 5, 10), pump organ (9)
 Garth Hudson – Hammond organ (2), accordion (6)
 Rob Burger – pump organ (3, 7)
 Kevin Breit – acoustic guitar (1, 3, 6, 7, 11, 12), resonator guitar (5, 8–10), banjolin (1), electric guitar and foot tapping (10), backup vocal (6)
 Jesse Harris – acoustic guitar (3, 4)
 Adam R. Levy – electric guitar (6, 8, 10, 11), acoustic guitar (5), backup vocal (1, 6, 7)
 Tony Scherr – electric guitar (2)
 Lee Alexander – acoustic bass (1–3, 5–12), electric bass (5), lap steel (12)
 Brian Blade – drums (12)
 Andrew Borger – drums (5, 6, 8, 10), slit drum (1), box (3, 11), snare drum (7)
 Levon Helm – drums (2)
 Dolly Parton – vocal (7)
 Daru Oda – backup vocals (1, 2, 5–8, 10–12), flutes (11)
 Jane Scarpantoni – cello (4)
 David Gold – viola (4)
 Arif Mardin – string arrangement (4)
 

Technical

Producers: Arif Mardin, Norah Jones
Recording and mixing engineer: Jay Newland
Assistant engineers: Matthew Cullen, Dick Kondas, Steve Mazur, Aya Takemura
Mastering: Gene Paul
Mastering assistant: Jamie Polaski
A&R: Eliott Wolf
A&R Assistant: Danny Markowitz
Product manager: Zach Hochkeppel
Creative director: Gordon Jee
Design production assistant: Burton Yount

Charts

Weekly charts

Year-end charts

Decade-end charts

Certifications and sales

References

External links
 Feels Like Home at Discogs
 Album Review at IGN
 Album Review at The New Yorker

2004 albums
Norah Jones albums
Albums produced by Arif Mardin
Blue Note Records albums
Country albums by American artists